Tangerine Dream is Kaleidoscope's debut album released by Fontana Records on 24 November 1967. Despite the group’s following, good reviews and radio play it failed to reach the charts.

It is considered a classic psychedelic album and has been compared to Nirvana's The Story of Simon Simopath and Pink Floyd's The Piper at the Gates of Dawn.

Peter Daltrey, lead singer of the band was asked about the lyrics and the music of the album, and he wrote the following statement in the sleeve notes:

"The collective subject of our songs is simple, life and people. We have written our songs about you. Happy people, sad people, lovely people and a few confused people. We have written of the children, of the king and his queen, and we have also included a few words about ourselves, about our lives, about our loves and about our dreams".

Track listing
All songs composed by Eddy Pumer (music) and Peter Daltrey (lyrics).
Side one
"Kaleidoscope" – 2:13
"Please Excuse My Face" – 2:08
"Dive into Yesterday" – 4:44
"Mr. Small, the Watch Repairer Man" – 2:40
"Flight from Ashiya" – 2:38
"The Murder of Lewis Tollani" – 2:45

Side two
"(Further Reflections) In the Room of Percussion" – 3:17
"Dear Nellie Goodrich" – 2:45
"Holidaymaker" – 2:27
"A Lesson Perhaps" – 2:39
"The Sky Children" – 7:59

Bonus tracks (Repertoire 2005)
"Flight from Ashiya" (Mono single version) – 2:38
"Holiday Maker" (Mono single version) – 2:27
"A Dream for Julie" (Mono) – 2:45
"Please Excuse My Face" (Mono single version) – 2:08
"Jenny Artichoke" – 2:34
"Just How Much You Are" (Mono) – 2:11

The album was re-released in 2011 by Sunbeam records, with all the original artwork and a 12-page inner book with new photos and recording history written by Peter Daltrey.

The album was released again in 2017 on 180-gram "tangerine" orange vinyl to commemorate the album's 50th Anniversary. This pressing was a limited run of 1,000 copies hand-marked by the band and included a digital download code, along with a bonus 45rpm single featuring the earliest recordings of "Kaleidoscope" and "A Dream for Julie"

Personnel
Peter Daltrey – vocals, keyboards
Eddy Pumer – guitar, keyboards
Steve Clark – bass, flute
Dan Bridgman – drums, percussion

References

External links
Album facts, info, lyrics and more

Kaleidoscope (British band) albums
1967 debut albums
Fontana Records albums